Advertising Standards Authority may refer to:

Advertising Standards Bureau (Australia)
Advertising Standards Authority for Ireland
Advertising Standards Authority (New Zealand)
Advertising Standards Authority (South Africa)
Advertising Standards Authority (United Kingdom)
Advertising Standards Canada
Advertising Standards Council of India
Advertising Standards Council (Philippines)

See also
Advertising
ASA (disambiguation)